Gainza, officially the Municipality of Gainza, is a 5th class municipality in the province of Camarines Sur, Philippines. According to the 2020 census, it has a population of 11,584 people.

Gainza is one of the oldest municipalities in Camarines Sur. Gainza is a part of Metro Naga Urban Area

History 

The town is not a young municipality neither it can be counted among the ancient towns and cities in the Bicol Region. However, its origin is as old as “Ciudad de Caceres” – Naga City today. The municipality was formerly a barrio of Ciudad de Cacares founded by Captain Pedro de Chavez.

The barrio of Ciudad de Caceres was called Sto. Domingo, after its patron saint, Sto. Domingo de Guzman. Because the natives of this farming and fishing village had progressively clung to the fertile lowland soil and fish- rich meandering rivers and creeks in the central part of the province, its people earned the benevolence and recognition of Bishop Francisco Gainza, O.P. of Nueva Caceres. On December 10, 1863, the Bishop gave the village of Sto. Domingo its Ecclesiastical Charter as a municipality. The feast of the parish patron saint, St. Dominic of Guzman is celebrated annually on 8 August.

It was named after the late bishop of Nueva Caceres, Francisco Gainza of the Dominican Order. He selected the barrio Sto. Domingo for the construction of a canal or passageway originally planned by two Franciscan Friars and by Governor Norzagaray as early as the first half of the 17th Century. 

The canal was to serve two purposes: one to connect the river of Naga to the sea of Pasacao which would shorten the route from Naga City to Manila avoiding the treacherous San Bernardino Strait, and the other is to serve as another outlet for the flood waters of the lower plains of the province.

If the Bicol River Basin Development Program had pushed through the building of the canal, the flooding of towns along the Bicol River could have been avoided. The death of the bishop overcame the ambitious project shortly after the work begun. This canal was called “Via Gainza” in honor of the courageous builder in whose name the town of Gainza was named. This canal is still discernible at present, and it is called in the place “napuhong salog” (abandoned canal).

His death also meant the end of its development. For political reasons (there were few voters) the town had been neglected in the matter of road building. After three centuries, a good road connecting this town to Naga City was never developed.

Geography

Barangays
Gainza is politically subdivided into 8 barangays:
 Cagbunga
 Dahilig
 Loob
 Malbong
 Namuat
 Sampaloc
 District I (poblacion)
 District II (poblacion)

Climate

Gainza borders Milaor to the south, Pamplona to the west, Canaman to the north, Camaligan and Naga City to the east. Gainza generally is in a plain land.

Demographics

Economy 

Majority of the land is devoted to rice, vegetables and other root crops.

Agricultural Sector:

▪ Rice (44%)

▪ Carrots (3%)

▪ Cabbages (25%)

▪ Root crops (28%)

Urban areas have small businesses and also fishing like rural areas do.

Infrastructure 
The new bridge that connects Sampaloc to the rest of Gainza is currently under construction. As of now to access far flung barangays are either by boat or a suspension bridge. It has a road that connects with Camaligan, Naga City, and Milaor.

Healthcare 

 Rural Health Center 1 (Cagbunga)
 Rural Health Center 2 (Sampaloc)
 Rural Health Center 3 (Malbong)

Gallery

References

External links

 [ Philippine Standard Geographic Code]
Official Site of the Province of Camarines Sur

Municipalities of Camarines Sur
Metro Naga